Sarah Vaughan, reissued in 1991 as Sarah Vaughan with Clifford Brown, is a 1955 jazz album featuring singer Sarah Vaughan and trumpeter Clifford Brown, released on the EmArcy label. It was the only collaboration between the two musicians. Well received, though not without some criticism, the album was Vaughan's own favorite among her works through 1980. The album was inducted into the Grammy Hall of Fame in 1999.

The album has been re-released on CD and LP many times, with its original nine-track listing and with an additional track.

Critical reception

Sarah Vaughan was overwhelmingly a critical success. Contemporary critics were enthusiastic, with Billboard opining, "Here are nine examples of Sarah Vaughan's vocal gifts. Her individual phrasing, her highly distinctive mannerisms are in the grooves. [...] For the dealer with any jazz trade at all, this package is virtually a must."

The record's reputation has grown since its release. In Bebop: The Best Musicians and Recordings, jazz commentator Scott Yanow notes simply of the album that "[e]verything works", making of it an "essential acquisition". Ink Blot Magazine, characterizing this as one of Vaughan's "jazziest" albums, describes it also as one of her greatest. In its review, All Music states that "Vaughan is arguably in the best voice of her career here" and praises Brown for "displaying his incredible bop virtuosity", indicating that "[i]n whichever incarnation it's reissued, Sarah Vaughan With Clifford Brown is one of the most important jazz-meets-vocal sessions ever recorded," although All Music is incorrect in suggesting that the album was retitled; Brown's name has been highlighted on some reissues of the album since 1990 although most reissues duplicate the original album cover. The Blackwell Guide to Recorded Jazz, also praising Brown's "brilliant" trumpeting, delves into Vaughan's vocal stylings in detail, encouraging listeners of the album to note how "sometimes she stretches out a song so deliberately and so reconfigures its melody, that the lyrics lose sense, linguistic phrasing having been replaced by musical phrasing". Blackwell author Barry Dean Kernfeld opines that "[i]t is perhaps this pure devotion to the exploration of sound that has made her such a favourite of jazz listeners". In Jazz: A Critic's Guide to the 100 Most Important Recordings, New York Times jazz commentator Ben Ratliff placed the album as among Vaughan's best, indicating that the recording session seemed among those blessed sessions where "even middle-level musicians can sound like gods". 
The Penguin Guide to Jazz selected this album as part of its suggested "Core Collection," stating "it is very difficult to find any flaw in what should be recognized as one of the great jazz vocal records," and awarded it "crown" status.

But even while praising the album, some critics found elements of fault. Ratliff expresses distaste for the album's "shizy moments, when...[Vaughan] rockets between hoity-toity...and so blues-singer earthy, in certain low-register moments, that she approaches vulgarity". A review in the music magazine Metronome at the time of its first release lamented: "Sarah sounds like an imitation of herself, sloppy, affected and so concerned with sound that she forgets that she is a singer, forgets the lyric of the song itself to indulge in sounds that are meaningless." Kernfeld suggests that Herbie Mann is a weak element amongst the otherwise strong ensemble, "completely overmatched", although The Penguin Guide to Jazz disagrees with this assessment.

Track listing
"Lullaby of Birdland" (George Shearing, George David Weiss) – 4:06
"April in Paris" (Vernon Duke, E.Y. "Yip" Harburg) – 6:26
"He's My Guy" (Gene de Paul, Don Raye) – 4:17
"Jim" (Caesar Petrillo, Edward Ross, Nelson Shawn) – 5:56
"You're Not the Kind" (Will Hudson, Irving Mills) – 4:48
"Embraceable You" (George Gershwin, Ira Gershwin) – 4:54
"I'm Glad There Is You" (Jimmy Dorsey, Paul Mertz) – 5:14
"September Song" (Maxwell Anderson, Kurt Weill) – 5:50
"It's Crazy" (Al Fields, Timmie Rogers) – 5:01

Personnel

Performance
Sarah Vaughan – vocals
Clifford Brown – trumpet
Paul Quinichette – tenor saxophone
Herbie Mann – flute
Jimmy Jones – piano
Joe Benjamin – bass
Roy Haynes – drums
Ernie Wilkins – conductor

Production
Robert Appleton – reissue design
Michael Bourne – liner notes
William Claxton – photography
Ken Druker – executive producer
Ellen Fitton – reissue mastering
Peter Keepnews – notes editing
Hollis King – reissue art director
Bryan Koniarz – reissue producer
Kiyoshi "Boxman" Koyama – research
Herman Leonard – reissue photography
Paul Ramey – CD preparation
Richard Seidel – CD preparation
Bob Shad – producer
Mark Smith – reissue production assistance
Sherniece Smith – art coordinator
Kiyoshi Tokiwa – remixing, research
Michael Ullman – liner notes
Ernie Wilkins – arranger

References

External links
Verve Records listing, with samples.

Sarah Vaughan albums
1955 albums
EmArcy Records albums
Grammy Hall of Fame Award recipients
Clifford Brown albums
Albums produced by Bob Shad
Albums conducted by Ernie Wilkins
Albums arranged by Ernie Wilkins